The election for Resident Commissioner to the United States House of Representatives took place on November 4, 1980, the same day as the larger Puerto Rican general election and the United States elections, 1980.

Candidates for Resident Commissioner
 Marta Font de Calero for the Puerto Rican Independence Party
 Baltasar Corrada del Río for the New Progressive Party
 José Arsenio Torres for the Popular Democratic Party

Election results

See also 
Puerto Rican general election, 1980

References 

1980 Puerto Rico elections
Puerto Rico
1980